Many of the Greek deities are known from as early as Mycenaean (Late Bronze Age) civilization. This is an incomplete list of these deities and of the way their names, epithets, or titles are spelled and attested in Mycenaean Greek, written in the Linear B syllabary, along with some reconstructions and equivalent forms in later Greek.

Deities

Gods
 Anemoi - attested through *Anemohiereia or *Anemon Hiereia, "Priestess of the Winds" (Linear B: , a-ne-mo-i-je-re-ja, a-ne-mo,i-je-re-ja)
 Apollo(?) - perhaps attested through the lacunose perio (Linear B: , pe-rjo-, reconstructed a-pe-rjo-ne)
 Ares (Linear B: , a-re)
 Despotas(?) - unclear, perhaps house deity (Linear B: , do-po-ta)
 Dionysus (Linear B: , di-wo-nu-so)
 Dipsioi - perhaps "the Thirsty and hence the Dead Ones"; perhaps  related to Thessalian month Dipsos, meaning obscure (Linear B: , di-pi-si-jo-i)
 Drimios - unknown, in later times, son of Zeus, perhaps a predecessor of Apollo (Linear B: , di-ri-mi-jo)
 Enesidaon - possibly a theonym; possibly an epithet of Poseidon, assumed to mean "Earthshaker" or something similar (Linear B: , e-ne-si-da-o-ne)
 Enyalius - a later epithet of Ares  (Linear B: , e-nu-wa-ri-jo)
 Hephaestus - regarded as indirectly attested by the name *Haphaistios or *Haphaistion, presumed to be a theophoric name (Linear B:  , a-pa-i-ti-jo)
 Hermes (Linear B: , e-ma-*25 or e-ma-ha)
 Areias - epithet (Linear B: , a-re-ja)
 Hyperion(?) - perhaps attested through the lacunose perio (Linear B: , pe-rjo-, reconstructed u-pe-rjo-ne)
 Marineus(?) - unknown deity, perhaps "God of the Woolens", meaning obscure (Linear B: , ma-ri-ne(-u?), ma-ri-ne-we, ma-ri-ne-wo)
 Pade(?) - possibly unknown god, thought to be Cretan, Minoan in origin (Linear B:  pa-de,  pa-de-i)
 Paean  - a precursor of Apollo (Linear B: , pa-ja-wo-ne)
 Poseidon - chief deity  (Linear B: , po-se-da-o, po-se-da-wo-ne)
 Trisheros - theonym, "Thrice-Hero"; thought to attest, and pertain to, the veneration of the dead (Linear B: , ti-ri-se-ro-e)
 Wanax - "the King"; in this case, it is considered to be a theonym in the dative case, perhaps as an epithet of Poseidon (Linear B: , wa-na-ka-te)
 Zeus - God of the sky (Linear B: , di-we, di-wo)
 Diktaios - local epithet of Zeus on Crete (Linear B: , di-ka-ta-jo di-we)

Goddesses
 Artemis (Linear B: , a-te-mi-to, a-ti-mi-te)
 Diwia - possibly the female counterpart of Zeus, possibly Dione in later Greek (Linear B: , di-u-ja, di-wi-ja)
 Doqeia(?) - possibly an unknown goddess but could be only a feminine adjective (Linear B: , do-qe-ja)
 Eileithyia - attested in the Cretan Eleuthia form; perhaps Minoan in origin (Linear B: , e-re-u-ti-ja)
 Eos - perhaps attested through a personal name Ἀϝohιος related to the word for dawn, or dative form Āwōiōi (Linear B: , a-wo-i-jo).
 Erinyes - both forms of the theonym are considered to be in the singular, Erinys (Linear B: , e-ri-nu, e-ri-nu-we)
 Hera (Linear B:  , e-ra)
 Iphemedeia - theonym; probably variant form of Iphimedia, name of a mythological person found in Homer's Odyssey (Linear B: , i-pe-me-de-ja)
 Komawenteia(?) - possibly unknown deity, possibly meaning "long-haired goddess" (Linear B:  ko-ma-we-te-ja)
 Leto - perhaps attested through the forms Latios (Linear B: , ra-ti-jo) and Lato (Linear B: , ra-to).
 Manasa - unknown goddess (Linear B: , ma-na-sa)
 Mater Theia - possibly "Mother of the Gods" or mother goddess (Linear B: , ma-te-re,te-i-ja)
 Pipituna - Reconstructed as * (Píptynna), unknown deity, considered to be Pre-Greek or Minoan (Linear B: , pi-pi-tu-na)
 Posidaeia - probably the female counterpart to Poseidon (Linear B: , po-si-da-e-ja)
 Potnia - “Mistress” or “Lady”; may be used as an epithet for many deities, but also shows up as a single deity (Linear B:  , po-ti-ni-ja)
 Potnia Athena - or Potnia of At(h)ana (Athens(?)); reference of the latter is uncertain (Linear B: , a-ta-na-po-ti-ni-ja)
 Potnia Hippeia - Mistress of the Horses; later epithet of Demeter and Athena (Linear B: , po-ti-ni-ja,i-qe-ja)
 Potnia of Sitos - Mistress of Grain, Bronze Age predecessor or epithet of Demeter (Linear B: , si-to-po-ti-ni-ja)
 Potnia of the Labyrinth (Linear B: , da-pu2-ri-to-jo,po-ti-ni-ja)
 Potnia, at Thebes, of no attested name or title, other than that offers are made to her house, her premises (Linear B: , po-ti-ni-ja,wo-ko-de)
 Potnia, of unidentified Pylos sanctuary - unknown local(?) goddess of  pa-ki-ja-ne (*Sphagianes?) sanctuary at Pylos (Linear B:  , po-ti-ni-ja)
 Potnia, of uncertain A place or epithet (Linear B: , po-ti-ni-ja,a-si-wi-ja)
 Potnia, of unknown E place or epithet (Linear B: , e-re-wi-jo-po-ti-ni-ja)
 Potnia, of unknown N place or epithet (Linear B: , ne-wo-pe-o,po-ti-ni-ja)
 Potnia, of unknown U place or epithet (Linear B: , u-po-jo-po-ti-ni-ja)
 Potnia, of unknown ? place or epithet (Linear B: , (?)-a-ke-si,po-ti-ni-ja)
 Preswa(?) - generally interpreted as a dove goddess or an early form of Persephone (Linear B: , pe-re-*82 or pe-re-swa)
 Qerasia(?) - unknown goddess, perhaps Minoan in origin or possibly connected with thēr (Linear B: , qe-ra-si-ja)
 Qowia(?) - unknown deity, possibly meaning “She of the Cow(s)" (Linear B: , qo-wi-ja)
 Wanasso(?) - "the Two Queens", possibly Demeter and Persephone, *wanassojin(?) regarded as a dative dual form (Linear B: , wa-na-so-i)

Pantheon
Pantes Theoi - a special invocation "to All the Gods", irrespectively of sex, etc.; recurrently attested at Knossos (Linear B : , pa-si-te-o-i)

Heroes, mortals and other entities or concepts
 Proteus - could be the theonym of the sea-god Proteus, but probably just the anthroponym of a nobleman (Linear B: , po-ro-te-u)

Possible deities
Deities speculated to have been worshipped but without hitherto attestation in the Linear B tablets

 A possible sun goddess, predecessor to Helios and possibly related to Helen. No unambiguous attestations of words for "sun" have been found yet, though the Mycenaean word for "sun" is reconstructed as *hāwélios.

See also

 Aegean civilizations
 Cycladic culture
 Epigraphy
 History of Greece
 History of religions
 History of writing
 Leiden Conventions
 Linear A
 Linear B
 Mycenaean religion
 Palaeography

Notes

References

Sources

Books

Articles in journals, periodicals and of conferences

Online databases and dictionaries
Mycenaean Greek and Linear B

Ancient Greek, Latin and of English etymology
 At the Perseus Project, a digital library project of Tufts University.
 
 At the Perseus Project.
 At the Perseus Project.

Further reading
 Duev, Ratko. "di-wi-ja and e-ra in the Linear B texts". In: Pierre Carlier, Additional editors: Charles De Lamberterie, Markus Egetmeyer, Nicole Guilleux, Françoise Rougemont and Julien Zurbach (editors). Études mycéniennes 2010. Actes du XIIIe colloque international sur les textes égéens, Sèvres, Paris, Nanterre, 20-23 septembre 2010. Biblioteca di Pasiphae. 10. Pisa; Roma: Fabrizio Serra editore, 2012. pp. 195–205. 
 Flouda, Georgia. “The Goddess Eileithyia in the Knossian Linear B Tablets”. In: Honors to Eileithyia at Ancient Inatos: The Sacred Cave of Eileithyia at Tsoutsouros. Crete: Highlights of the Collection. Edited by Athanasia Kanta et al., INSTAP Academic Press, 2022. pp. 33–36, https://doi.org/10.2307/j.ctv2f4v5x3.12. Accessed 10 Apr. 2022.
 
 
 Wachter, Rudolf. "Homeric – Mycenaean Word Index (MYC)". In: Prolegomena. Edited by Joachim Latacz, Anton Bierl and Stuart Douglas Olson [English Edition]. Berlin, München, Boston: De Gruyter, 2015. pp. 236–258. https://doi.org/10.1515/9781501501746-015

Mycenaean Greece
Minoan culture
Minoan civilization
Cretan mythology
Religion in ancient Crete
Ancient Greek religion
Ancient Greek culture
Lists of deities
Greek deities